Saint-Jean-du-Doigt is a commune in the Finistère department of Brittany in north-western France.

Population
Inhabitants of Saint-Jean-du-Doigt are called in French Saint Jeannais.

See also
Communes of the Finistère department
Saint-Jean-du-Doigt Parish close

References

External links

  Cultural Heritage 
Mayors of Finistère Association 

Communes of Finistère